Club Atlético Voleibol Murcia 2005, also known for sponsorship reason as Grupo 2002 Murcia, was a Spanish volleyball club based in Murcia that played their home matches at the Pabellón Príncipe de Asturias in Murcia.

The team participated in the Women's CEV Champions League 2007-08.

The football section club's is CF Atlético Ciudad.

Titles
Superliga Femenina (3)
2007, 2008 & 2009
Copa de la Reina (5)
2007, 2008, 2009, 2010, 2011
Supercopa de España (4)
2006, 2007, 2009, 2010
CEV Top Teams Cup (1)
2006–07

Notable players
  Fofão (2007–2008)
  Walewska Oliveira (2007–2008)
  Jaqueline Carvalho (2007–2008)
  Fernanda Venturini (2006–2007)
  Malgorzata Glinka (2006–2008)
  Lioubov Sokolova (2006–2007)
  Nancy Metcalf (2006–2007)
  Kim Willoughby (2006–2007)
  Frauke Dirickx (2005–2007)
  Ingrid Visser (2009–2011)
  Ana Ivis Fernández (2009–2010)
  Annerys Vargas (2006–2007)
  Prisilla Rivera (2006–2011)

References

External links
Official website

Spanish volleyball clubs
Sport in Murcia
Volleyball clubs established in 2005
Volleyball clubs disestablished in 2011
Sports teams in the Region of Murcia
2005 establishments in Spain
2011 disestablishments in Spain